George Oliver Bowerman (born 6 November 1991) is an English professional footballer who plays as a forward for Cradley Town.

He began his career with Walsall, and spent brief periods with non-League clubs Redditch United and Woking before joining Accrington Stanley in October 2013.

Career

Walsall
Bowerman was born in Sedgley, West Midlands, and came through the Walsall youth academy to sign professional forms with the club in summer 2010. In February 2011, he joined Conference North club Redditch United on loan to gain first team experience. Despite not featuring for the Saddlers in 2010–11, he was given a new six-month contract at the end of the season.

He made his Walsall debut at the Bescot Stadium on 9 August 2011, replacing Ryan Jarvis 81 minutes into a 3–0 defeat to Middlesbrough in the League Cup. He scored his first professional goal after coming on as a substitute in a 4–2 home defeat to Bury on 19 November. Bowerman began 2012–13 with six goals from eleven games, but scored only once more in the remainder of the season, and was released.

Accrington Stanley
After playing twice for Woking in the Conference, Bowerman joined League Two club Accrington Stanley in October 2013 until the end of the season.

Non League
After leaving Accrington, Bowerman dropped back into the Conference signing for  Altrincham in August 2015. Then after a season he moved into the Southern League with Stafford Rangers, then 4 months later joined Halesowen Town, before finishing the season at Rushall Olympic.

In October 2017, Bowerman joined Market Drayton Town. After a spell with Quorn, Bowerman joined Cradley Town on 12 November 2019.

Coaching career
In summer 2018, Bowerman was hired as U11 manager at his former club Walsall.

Career statistics

References

External links

1991 births
Living people
People from Sedgley
English footballers
Association football forwards
Walsall F.C. players
Redditch United F.C. players
Woking F.C. players
Accrington Stanley F.C. players
Altrincham F.C. players
Stourbridge F.C. players
National League (English football) players
English Football League players
Stafford Rangers F.C. players
Hinckley A.F.C. players
Rushall Olympic F.C. players
Halesowen Town F.C. players
Market Drayton Town F.C. players
Quorn F.C. players
Cradley Town F.C. players